Kevin Harvey (born September 14, 1984) is a Canadian professional ice hockey winger playing for the Sydney Ice Dogs of the Australian Ice Hockey League (AIHL).

Career 
Harvey was selected by the Calgary Flames in the ninth round (270th overall) of the 2003 NHL Entry Draft. He has previously played for the Syracuse Crunch and the Springfield Falcons in the American Hockey League before playing abroad with  HC Slovan Bratislava in the Slovak Extraliga.

After the 2013–14 season which he split between English club, Coventry Blaze of the Elite Ice Hockey League and the Rapid City Rush of the Central Hockey League, Harvey returned to sign with his fourth ECHL club, the Evansville IceMen on August 13, 2014. Midway through the season Harvey lead the league with 17 major penalties and was traded on February 2, 2015, to the Rapid City Rush in exchange for future considerations.

Harvey joined the Sydney Ice Dogs in Australia's AIHL on May 15, 2015, on a one-year contract for the 2015 season.

Career statistics

References

External links

1984 births
Living people
Calgary Flames draft picks
Canadian expatriate ice hockey players in Slovakia
Canadian ice hockey left wingers
Coventry Blaze players
Elmira Jackals (ECHL) players
Evansville IceMen players
Ice hockey people from Ontario
Kingston Frontenacs players
New Mexico Scorpions (CHL) players
Ontario Junior Hockey League players
Owen Sound Attack players
Rapid City Rush players
Reading Royals players
HC Slovan Bratislava players
Sportspeople from Hamilton, Ontario
Springfield Falcons players
Syracuse Crunch players
Toledo Walleye players
Canadian expatriate ice hockey players in England
Canadian expatriate ice hockey players in the United States